Nijaz Lena (born 25 June 1986) is a Macedonian professional footballer who plays as a midfielder for FC Struga. He also holds Albanian passport.

Club career

Flamurtari Vlorë
On 20 February 2013, Lena recorded his 100th appearance with Flamurtari in all competitions during the 2–3 away win against Bylis Ballsh, match valid for the Group B of 2012–13 Albanian Cup.

In July 2013, Lena signed a new one-year deal with the club, keeping him at the club until 2014.

On 18 May 2014, Lena won his first trophy with Flamurtari, the Albanian Cup, where played as a starter as Flamurtari prevail 1–0 over Kukësi in the final held at Qemal Stafa Stadium.

In June 2014, due to his international duties, Lena missed pre-season preparations for the 2014–15 season.

It was reported that Lena left the team after refusing to be a backup for the new signing Nderim Nexhipi. This report was strengthened by Lena itself, who refused to travel with the team to Slovenia, for pre-season preparations. He extended his contract with Flamurtari Vlorë for another season, however, on 23 August 2015.

On 5 January 2016, Lena eventually left the team after six years, which was confirmed by Lena itself on his Facebook profile.

Teuta Durrës
On 15 January 2016, Lena signed a contract until the end of 2015–16 season with Teuta Durrës, joined former Flamurtari boss Magani. He was presented four days later, where he was assigned the vacant number 10.

His Teuta Durrës debut came on 23 January 2016 during the first leg of 2015–16 Albanian Cup quarter-final clash against Kukësi, where he appeared as a second-half substitute for Eri Lamçja. He made his league debut eight days later against his former club Flamurtari Vlorë in a 1–0 away loss, playing over 75 minutes. Since that, Lena was able to established himself in the starting lineup, helping the club in its bid to achieve a European spot for the next season. He scored his first goal on 8 May against Skënderbeu Korçë with e penalty kick, with a Panenka style penalty, in an eventual 1–1 home draw.

Lena ended the 2015–16 season by making 20 appearances between league and cup, scoring once in the process, as Teuta Durrës clinched the fourth spot to return in the European competitions for the 2016–17 season. On 30 June, Lena made his European debut for the club by playing 65 minutes in the 1–0 home defeat to Kairat in the Europa League first qualifying round. In the returning leg one week later, Lena played full-90 minutes as Teuta was humbled 5–0 at Central Stadium.

On 2 August, Lena decided to part ways with the club after not finding a way for the new deal.

Kukësi
On 3 August 2016, Lena signed a one-year contract with Kukësi as a free agent, rejoining his former Flamurtari Vlorë boss Ernest Gjoka and was presented on the same day. He was also a target of Vllaznia Shkodër and Laçi. He made his competitive debut on 25 August as a substitute in the 2016 Albanian Supercup against Skënderbeu Korçë which ended in a 3–1 win at Selman Stërmasi Stadium. During the 2016–17 season, Lena played as a starter, making 30 league appearances, 28 as starter, collecting 2415 minutes as Kukësi won their maiden championship.

Teuta Durrës return
On 5 August 2017, Lena returned to Teuta Durrës after only one season by penning a contract until June 2019. His was given his old squad number 10 and was named the new captain. Lena made his first appearance of the season on 9 September in the opening matchday against Luftëtari Gjirokastër, netting a penalty kick in a 2–1 home win. On 28 December, after a meeting with president Edmond Hasanbelliu, Lena decided to finish his cooperation with Teuta by terminating the contract by mutual consent.

International career

In June 2014, Lena received a call-up for the first time from Macedonia senior team for the friendlies against China. In the first match on 18th, Lena was able to make his debut by playing as a starter before being substituted in 71st minute for Besmir Bojku, as Macedonia lost 2–0.

He won his second cap four days later, playing again as a starter, but this time in a goalless draw.

Career statistics

Club

International

Honours
Flamurtari Vlorë

Albanian Cup: 2013–14

Kukësi
Albanian Superliga: 2016–17

References

External links

 
 
 Profile at Macedonian Football

1986 births
Living people
Sportspeople from Struga
Albanians in North Macedonia
Association football midfielders
Macedonian footballers
North Macedonia youth international footballers
North Macedonia international footballers
FK Renova players
FK Makedonija Gjorče Petrov players
Flamurtari Vlorë players
KF Teuta Durrës players
FK Kukësi players
FC Telavi players
FC Struga players
Macedonian First Football League players
Kategoria Superiore players
Macedonian Second Football League players
Macedonian expatriate footballers
Macedonian expatriate sportspeople in Albania